Old Hunstanton is a village and civil parish in the English county of Norfolk.
The population had risen to 628 at the 2011 Census.
For the purposes of local government, it falls within the district of King's Lynn and West Norfolk.

This small settlement adjoins to the north the larger resort of Hunstanton or 'New Hunstanton'. The quiet character of Old Hunstanton remains distinct from and complements that of its busy sibling, with clifftop walks past the disused Old Hunstanton Lighthouse and the ruins of St Edmund's Chapel, built in 1272. King Edmund of East Anglia supposedly built the village. The River Hun runs to the coast just to the east of Old Hunstanton.

The parish church of St Mary, situated in the grounds of Hunstanton Hall, is a Grade I listed building. It was built by Sir Hamon le Strange in about 1300 and extensively rebuilt and restored during the 19th century by architect Frederick Preedy for Henry Le Strange (1815–1862), developer of New Hunstanton.  In the parish, at the deserted medieval village of Barret Ringstead (or Ringstead Parva), is the ruined Chapel of St Andrew which is Grade II*.

St Mary's churchyard contains the graves of a customs officer William Green and William Webb of the 15th Light Dragoons, both of whom were fatally wounded during a skirmish on the Hunstanton coast with smugglers. The clash occurred on the night of 25 September 1784, also claiming the life of another customs officer named Rennett. However, although the alleged perpetrators were tried at Thetford the following year it proved impossible to secure any convictions. Both gravestones are Grade II listed; one has "Here be the mangled remains of poor William Green an Honest Officer of Government who/in the faithful discharge of his duty/was inhumanely murdered/by a gang of smugglers in this parish."

The Hunstanton Lifeboat Station at Old Hunstanton is a RNLI lifeboat station with a B class (Atlantic) boat and a hovercraft.

Parts of the beach are backed by sand dunes and are the location for beach huts.

Storms deposit items on the beach including marine life this may be strandings of cetaceans, mass strandings of starfish and shellfish or boats wrecked in storms. In December 2011 a large whale washed ashore on the beach.

History 
The village of Old Hunstanton is recorded in the Domesday Book as ‘Hunestanestada’.
Later it became part of the Le Strange family (or L'Estrange) estates.

References

External links

 Old Postcards of Hunstanton
 Hunstanton Hall entry from The DiCamillo Companion to British & Irish Country Houses
 Old Hunstanton Website

Hunstanton
Villages in Norfolk
Populated coastal places in Norfolk
Civil parishes in Norfolk
King's Lynn and West Norfolk